Nothando "Vivo" Vilakazi (born 28 October 1988) is a South African soccer player who plays as a defender for Spanish Primera División club EdF Logroño and the South Africa women's national team.

Early life
Nothando Vilakazi was born in Middelburg, South Africa, on 28 October 1988. She played for a boys team between the ages of 9 and 14, when she started playing with girls. At the age of 17, she started playing in the Sasol League for the Highlanders team. She completed her schooling at TuksSport High School, associated with the University of Pretoria's High Performance Centre, for which she was selected while representing Mpumalanga at a tournament.

Career
Vilakazi played for Palace Super Falcons, having previously played for Moroka Swallows. In footballing circles, she is nicknamed "Vivo".

International
She made her international debut for the South Africa women's national football team against Ghana in 2007. Vilakazi has been a regular feature of the team as they were managed by Vera Pauw. Vilakazi was part of the team which were runners up in the 2012 African Women's Championship.

As part of the South African team, she has played at both the 2012 Summer Olympics in London, United Kingdom, and the 2016 Summer Olympics in Rio de Janeiro, Brazil. She played in all six of South Africa's games at the 2016 tournament. Vilakazi has continued to feature in the squads for the nation following the transition to the management of Desiree Ellis after the Olympics.

References

External links

Nothando Vilakazi at BDFútbol
Nothando Vilakazi – UEFA competition record

1988 births
Living people
South African women's soccer players
Women's association football defenders
Gintra Universitetas players
South Africa women's international soccer players
Footballers at the 2012 Summer Olympics
Olympic soccer players of South Africa
Footballers at the 2016 Summer Olympics
2019 FIFA Women's World Cup players
FIFA Century Club
South African expatriate soccer players
South African expatriate sportspeople in Lithuania
Expatriate women's footballers in Lithuania
South African expatriate sportspeople in Spain
Expatriate women's footballers in Spain